The third metacarpal bone (metacarpal bone of the middle finger) is a little smaller than the second.

The dorsal aspect of its base presents on its radial side a pyramidal eminence, the styloid process, which extends upward behind the capitate; immediately distal to this is a rough surface for the attachment of the extensor carpi radialis brevis muscle.

The carpal articular facet is concave behind, flat in front, and articulates with the capitate.

On the radial side is a smooth, concave facet for articulation with the second metacarpal, and on the ulnar side two small oval facets for the fourth metacarpal.

Ossification
The ossification process begins in the shaft during prenatal life, and in the head between 11th and 27th months.

Additional images

See also
 Metacarpus
 First metacarpal bone
 Second metacarpal bone
 Fourth metacarpal bone
 Fifth metacarpal bone

References

Skeletal system
Bones of the hand
Metacarpus